Manca Slabanja (born 8 August 1995) is a Slovenian cross-country skier. She competed in the women's 15 kilometre skiathlon at the 2018 Winter Olympics.

Cross-country skiing results
All results are sourced from the International Ski Federation (FIS).

Olympic Games

World Cup

Season standings

References

External links
 

1995 births
Living people
Slovenian female cross-country skiers
Olympic cross-country skiers of Slovenia
Cross-country skiers at the 2018 Winter Olympics
Place of birth missing (living people)